Rusty Bryant Returns is an album by jazz saxophonist Rusty Bryant recorded for the Prestige label in 1969. The album marked Bryant's return to recording, being the first under his leadership since 1957.

Reception

The Allmusic site awarded the album 4 stars stating "The music (mostly blues-oriented originals) is enjoyable, with plenty of boogaloos and soulful vamps".

Track listing
All compositions by Rusty Bryant except as noted
 "Zoo Boogaloo" - 7:19  
 "The Cat" (Lalo Schifrin) - 7:49  
 "Ready Rusty?" - 4:46  
 "Streak O' Lean" - 5:56  
 "Night Flight" - 7:53  
 "All Day Long" (Kenny Burrell) - 9:39

Personnel
Rusty Bryant - alto saxophone
Sonny Phillips - organ
Grant Green - guitar
Bob Bushnell - bass
Herbie Lovelle - drums

Production
 Bob Porter - producer
 Rudy Van Gelder - engineer

References

Rusty Bryant albums
1969 albums
Prestige Records albums
Albums produced by Bob Porter (record producer)
Albums recorded at Van Gelder Studio